Minoga (Минога - Lamprey) was a submarine built for the Imperial Russian Navy. She was built by Baltic Yard in Saint Petersburg and designed by Ivan Bubnov. She was a single hulled boat with a 16 fathom (30 metres) diving depth. While an advance on previous boats, the single shaft design was not very maneuverable and the diesel engines were not reliable. The boat served in the Baltic Fleet during World War I but was transferred to the Caspian Sea Flotilla in 1918. She was decommissioned and scrapped in 1922

References

 Conway's All the World's Fighting Ships 1906–1921

Submarines of the Imperial Russian Navy
Ships built at the Baltic Shipyard
1908 ships
World War I submarines of Russia